Aleksandr Alekseyevich Subbotin (born 20 October 1991) is a Russian professional football player.

Club career
He made his Russian Premier League debut for FC Amkar Perm on 1 April 2012 in a game against FC Terek Grozny.

Honours

Individual
 Russian Professional Football League Zone Ural-Privolzhye top scorer (12 goals) (2018–19).

References

External links
 

1991 births
Sportspeople from Perm, Russia
Living people
Russian footballers
Russia youth international footballers
Russian Premier League players
FC Amkar Perm players
FC Baltika Kaliningrad players
FC Dynamo Saint Petersburg players
FC KAMAZ Naberezhnye Chelny players
Association football forwards
FC Tambov players
FC Neftekhimik Nizhnekamsk players
FC Tyumen players
FC Zvezda Perm players